Click-B (클릭비) is a South Korean boy group and band formed in August 1999 under DSP Media. Click-B started out as a band combining rock and dance beats in their music. They became a four member group in 2002, with several member changes over the next few years. In 2015, the group made a seven member comeback with the single album Reborn.

History
Click-B formed in August 1999 under Daesung Entertainment (now DSP Media).

The band split in 2002, with 4 members remaining. In 2003, the 4th album was released with Woo Yun-suk, Oh Jong-hyuk, Kim Sang-hyuk, and Kim Tae-hyung. In 2004, they joined the k-pop duo, J-Walk (consisting of two previous Sechskies members Jang Suwon and Kim Jaeduck) to form a project band, JnC. After JnC, member Kim Tae Hyung left the group to pursue personal interests.

In 2006, Click-B (with the previous arrangement of 3 remaining members Oh Jong-hyuk, Woo Yun-suk and Kim Sang-hyuk) released their 5th album "Smile".

In 2011, Click-B (with all seven members) got together for a brief comeback with two new singles, "To Be Continued" in April and "빈 자리 (Empty Seat)" in November.

On December 14, 2013, DSP Media organized a concert 'DSP Festival' at Jamshil Arena where Click-B performed as a group along with other artists under the same management. A few members were absent for various reasons: Evan (Yoo Ho-suk) was still serving his military obligation, Kim Sang-hyuk was on hiatus from the entertainment industry and Kang Hoo (Kim Tae-hyung) was busy with his acting career.

In August 2015, a comeback with all seven members was announced, later confirmed for October. DSP Media announced the group would hold its first concert after thirteen years since debut, "7-3=7" on November 21. The group released "Reborn" on October 21.

Members
 Kim Tae-hyung (김태형)
 Woo Yun-suk (우연석)
 Oh Jong-hyuk (오종혁)
 Kim Sang-hyuk (김상혁)
 Ha Hyun-gon (하현곤)
 Yoo Ho-suk (유호석)
 No Min-hyuk (노민혁)

Discography

Studio albums 
Click-B (1999)
Challenge (2000)
Click-B3 (2001)
Cowboy (2003)

Compilation albums 

 To You (너에게) (2002)
 The Best of Click-B (2004)
 Smile (2006)

Single albums 
Reborn (2015)

Digital singles 
To Be Continued (2011)
Empty Seat (빈 자리) (2011)

Concert and tour 

 Click-B in Live Festival (2000)
 The Legend of Seven Princes (2001)
 Click-B Concert "Growing Up" (2002)
 Click-B Concert "A Midsummer Night" (2002)
 #3 Live Concert (2003)
 7-3=7 (2015)

Awards

Mnet Asian Music Awards

References

External links 

  
  
 MTV K video listings

South Korean boy bands
Musical groups established in 1999
K-pop music groups
DSP Media artists
Musical groups disestablished in 2002
1999 establishments in South Korea